Mugilan is a 2020 Indian  Tamil-language crime thriller miniseries, produced as an Original for ZEE5, written and directed by Sri Ram Ram and edited by Tamil Arasan. It stars Karthik Raj and Ramya Pandian in the main lead roles.

The miniseries is set in the backdrop of 1970s era and it is based on how socio political elements eventually triggered to a rise of a gangster in Tamil Nadu. It was released on 30 October 2020.

Premise
The series depicts socio-political events that led to the rise of one of the most dreaded gangsters of Kanchipuram district in Tamil Nadu in the 1970s called Mugilan.

Cast 
 Karthik Raj as Mugilan
 Ramya Pandian as Maheshwari
 Asha Rathi as Malar Mugilan's daughter
 Aadukalam Naren as Mudaliyar
 Gayatri Rema as Devi
 Robert as Saravanan
 Risha Jacobs as Saravanan's girlfriend
 Raj Kumar. M as Rajendran
 Junior Balaiah as Dhashwanth

Production 
Karthik Raj was roped into play the male lead role in the series while he was busy with shooting for Zee Tamil television soap opera Sembaruthi. Ramya Pandian was roped into play the main female lead and made her digital debut through the project.

Release 
This is the first web series to be announced by the ZEE5 platform for the release after the COVID-19 pandemic lockdown in India. It was released through ZEE5 on 30 October 2020.

Episodes

Reception 
Navein Darshan from Cinemaexpress wrote that it is "an unengaging gangster drama that fails due to lack of clarity in writing and underwhelming performances" but appreciated “the landscapes."

References

External links 
 
Mugilan on ZEE5

ZEE5 original programming
Tamil-language web series
Tamil-language crime television series
Tamil-language thriller television series
2020 Tamil-language television series debuts
2020 Tamil-language television series endings